Yasin Yılmaz (born 19 February 1989) is a Turkish-German professional footballer who plays as a midfielder for FC Ismaning.

Career
Yılmaz played in Bayern Munich's youth system, before being released in 2007 and signing for neighbours SpVgg Unterhaching. After a few years in the club's reserve team, he made his debut in a 3. Liga match against Bayern Munich II in February 2011, as a substitute for Tim Jerat. Since then he held down a regular place in the first team, before leaving the club at the end of the 2012–13 season to join Adanaspor.

External links
 
 
 Profile at FuPa.net

1989 births
Living people
Association football midfielders
Turkish footballers
German people of Turkish descent
SpVgg Unterhaching players
SpVgg Unterhaching II players
Adanaspor footballers
Tarsus Idman Yurdu footballers
Türkgücü München players
3. Liga players
Footballers from Munich
Bayernliga players
TFF First League players
TFF Second League players